Žabnica is a village in Croatia. It is connected by the D28 highway. It is surrounded by several villages : Haganj,
Zvonik and Stara Kapela.

Populated places in Zagreb County